Docton is an historic estate in the parish of Hartland in Devon. The former "mansion house" situated 3 miles south-west of the village of Hartland was the residence of the Docton (originally de Docton) family from the 15th century. Today the estate having been split-up comprises separate holdings of Docton Farm, a working farm which operates holiday-let cottages including Waterwheel Cottage, Old Granary Cottage and Old Millhouse Cottage. Docton Mill, the estate's former corn mill, is now operated as award-winning tea-rooms with a garden open to the public. The arms of the Docton family were: Per fess gules and argent, two crescents in chief or another in base sable. These may be seen, amongst other places, in a 1933 stained glass window in St Nectan's Church, Hartland, by Townshend and Howson and on the ledger stone to Phillipa Cary (1603-1633) in Clovelly Church.

Descent

John I Doketon (fl. 1459) of Kilkhampton in Cornwall, near Docton.
Thomas Doketon (fl.15th c.) (son) "de Doketon in hundred de Hartland" is the earliest member of this family recorded in the Heraldic Visitations of Devon, from information submitted by the family to the heralds in 1620. He married Alicia Ashe.
John II Doketon, eldest son and heir, who married Agnes Chantrell (d.1585), heiress of her father. The arms of Chantrell (Argent, three talbots passant sable) are thus shown quartered by Docton on the ledger stone of her son Thomas I Doketon (d.1618) in Hartland Church.
Thomas I Doketon (d.1618), eldest son and heir. He married Alice Atkin (d.1619), daughter of John Atkin of Blegberry in the parish of Hartland. A monument to Alice survives in Hartland Church. He is said by Chope (1940) (but without source being stated) to have supposedly in wrath killed his own son Nicholas Docton (1574-1610) by hitting him with a belt buckle. His ledger stone in St Nectan's Church, Hartland, bore originally a "quaint" epitaph which is oft-quoted, for example in Epitaphs for Country Churchyards by Augustus John Cuthbert Hare. It begins "Rejoice not over me, oh my enemie" but was originally  surrounded by a brass ledger line inscribed with the following verse:
"Here l lie outside the chancel door;
Here I lie because I'm poor:
The further in, the more they pay;
But here I lie as warm as they".
The slab was originally placed in the churchyard outside the chancel door, but in 1848 was brought inside and set into the floor of the chancel. However it "disproves the assertion of poverty" as it is a costly item comprising a brass plate beautifully engraved with the arms of Docton quartering Chantrell (Argent, three talbots passant sable), complete with helm, mantling, crest and Latin motto: Deus Dat Deus Aufert ("the Lord gave and the Lord hath taken away", Job 1:21). Below are two texts from the Bible. The ledger stone of his wife Alice Atkin in similar form survives, complete with brass lettering in the ledger line as follows:
Heere lyeth the...of Mris Alice Docton, Widdow, late the wife of Thomas Docton of Docton Esquier, deceased, who was buried the second day of Septem. Anno Do. 1619 who gave by her will xx pounds to remayne in a stocke for the use of the poore of this parish forever. The righteous perisheth and no man layeth it to heart" (Isaiah 57:1)

As he left no surviving issue he "left his inheritance to one of his name", namely his first cousin Thomas II Docton (d.1638), the eldest son of Richard Docton (d.1570/1) of Welsford.
Thomas II Docton (d.1638), first cousin, who in 1598 married Susan Batacom (d.1634) of Tavistock, Devon.
John III Docton (1600-1653), eldest son and heir. He was lord of the manor of Stoke by Hartland, as is revealed by his will. He married three times:
Firstly in 1621 to Ellen Harper (d.1624)
Secondly to Phillipa Cary (1603-1633), second daughter of William II Cary (1576-1652), lord of the manor of Clovelly, JP for Devon, MP for Mitchell, Cornwall, in 1604, She died after one year of marriage and left an only daughter Phillipa Docton. Her elaborately sculpted ledger stone survives in Clovelly Church, showing in the centre the arms of Docton (Per fess gules and argent, two crescents in chief or another in base sable) impaling Cary, and inscribed as follows:
(within a ledger line): "Here lyeth ye body of Phillip ye second daughter of William Cary Esq, wief of John Docton of Docton, Gent., wth whom she lived one yere & had by him on(e) daughter named Phillip & was buried ye 20th of October 1633". (Above an escutcheon): "Aetatis suae 30" (of her age 30) "Dum Spiro Spero". (Verse in the middle of the stone):
She's gon to Heaven yt liv'd on Earth,
A saynt if saynts drawe mortall breath.
Hope was her anchor, faith her sheilde,
Love to the poore ye Elizean Feilde
Through wch shee past unto her rest,
To raigne wth Christ for ever blest.
This way she went, oh hasten on!
While 'tis today ye way she's gon.
Externall bewty let it passe!
What is't but fflesh you se is grasse.
Thirdly to a certain Cicely (d.1639)
Thomas III Docton (born 1635), eldest son and heir, a minor at his father's death, whose wardship was provided for in his father's will.
?
Phillip Docton (1667-1743), whose parentage is unclear, the last in the male line of the Docton family of Docton, whose ledger stone survives in Hartland Church, formerly in a place of great honour within the communion rails. It is inscribed: "A gentleman eminent for his strict honour and integrity". He married Elizabeth Herle (1680-1718), daughter of Nicholas Herle of Landue in Cornwall. The ledger stone displays the arms of Docton impaling Herle (Gules, a fess sable between three shoveller ducks proper).

Sources
Chope, R.Pearse, The Book of Hartland, Torquay, 1940 
Vivian, Lt.Col. J.L., (Ed.) The Visitations of the County of Devon: Comprising the  Heralds' Visitations of 1531, 1564 & 1620, Exeter, 1895, pp. 286–7, pedigree of Docton of Docton

References

Historic estates in Devon